Brian Mayes (born 11 April 1950) is an English former cricketer who made one List A cricket appearance for Suffolk County Cricket Club in 1980.

Mayes was born at Margate in Kent where his father, Dicky Mayes, was a professional cricketer for Kent County Cricket Club, and educated at Ipswich School.

Mayes made his debut for Suffolk in the 1969 Minor Counties Championship, playing a total of 22 Championship matches in the tournament for the county between then and 1980. He made his only List A appearance against Sussex in the 1980 Gillette Cup.

References

External links

1950 births
Living people
People from Ramsgate
People educated at Ipswich School
English cricketers
Suffolk cricketers